Elle McLemore (born September 16, 1991) is an American actress. She originated the roles of Eva in the Tony nominated Broadway musical production Bring It On and Heather McNamara in Heathers: The Musical, the musical adaptation of the cult classic film (1988) of the same name. She also starred in the final season of the television series Army Wives. In 2016, she played Patty Simcox in the TV special Grease: Live.

Early life
Elle McLemore was born in Honolulu, Hawaii to Gail Van Dervoort, a dancer and father Todd Vandervoort, a pyrotechnician. She grew up in Las Vegas, Nevada. She has a sister Brittany. She has Irish and Japanese roots. At age four, she toured for 18 months with her family for the Melinda: First Lady of Magic show. Her mother danced on the show and was the magician's assistant while her father did pyrotechnics.  She attended Palo Verde High School, where she performed in the school productions Grease, and Peter Pan and in the benefit concert God Lives in Glass. She graduated in 2009 and moved to Los Angeles to pursue an acting career.

Stage credits

Filmography

References

External links

1991 births
21st-century American actresses
Actresses from Las Vegas
American people of Irish descent
American stage actresses
American television actresses
Living people
Actresses from Honolulu
American actresses of Japanese descent